Francis Froidevaux (born 26 April 1971) is a retired Swiss football defender.

Froidevaux played in Neuchatel Xamax's 5–1 victory in the UEFA Cup over Glasgow Celtic in 1991, coming on as a sub in the 34th minute.

References

1971 births
Living people
Swiss men's footballers
Neuchâtel Xamax FCS players
SR Delémont players
Association football defenders
Swiss Super League players
Switzerland under-21 international footballers